The 1981 Widener Pioneers football team represented Widener University as a member of the Middle Atlantic Conference (MAC) during the 1981 NCAA Division III football season. In their 13th season under head coach Bill Manlove, the Pride compiled a 13–0 record and won the NCAA Division III championship.

The team played its home games in Chester, Pennsylvania.

Schedule

References

Widener
Widener Pride football seasons
NCAA Division III Football Champions
Widener football
College football undefeated seasons